Valère Van Sweevelt (born 15 April 1947) is a Belgian former racing cyclist. He won the 1968 edition of the Liège–Bastogne–Liège.

Valère was the older brother of Belgian former racing cyclist Ronny Van Sweevelt.

Major results

1966
 2nd Circuit de Wallonie
1967
 1st Flèche Ardennaise
 1st Ronde van Vlaanderen Beloften
1968
 1st Liège–Bastogne–Liège
 1st Stages 3 & 4b Paris–Nice
 2nd Rund um den Henninger Turm
 2nd Züri-Metzgete
 4th Tour du Condroz
 5th Nokere Koerse
1969
 3rd Omloop Het Volk
 3rd Ronde van Limburg
 4th Tour du Condroz
 6th Gent–Wevelgem
 9th Amstel Gold Race
1970
 9th Grand Prix de Wallonie

References

External links
 

1947 births
Living people
Belgian male cyclists
Sportspeople from Hasselt
Cyclists from Limburg (Belgium)